Manuel 'Manu' Hernández-Sonseca Hervás (born 6 June 1986 in Aranjuez, Community of Madrid) is a Spanish retired footballer and currently assistant manager of  Swiss Challenge League club Lausanne-Sport who played as a defensive midfielder.

External links

Stats at HLSZ 

1986 births
Living people
Spanish footballers
Footballers from the Community of Madrid
Association football midfielders
Segunda División B players
Tercera División players
Atlético Madrid B players
Getafe CF B players
Getafe CF footballers
FC Admira Wacker Mödling players
Nemzeti Bajnokság I players
Zalaegerszegi TE players
Spanish expatriate footballers
Expatriate footballers in Austria
Expatriate footballers in Hungary
Expatriate footballers in Norway
Spanish expatriate sportspeople in Austria
Spanish expatriate sportspeople in Hungary
Spanish expatriate sportspeople in Norway